Seppo Liitsola (7 February 1933 – 18 July 2012) was a professional ice hockey player who played in the SM-liiga. He played ice hockey for Tappara and TBK. He was inducted into the Finnish Hockey Hall of Fame in 1986.

Liitsola coached the national team of Finland from 1969 to 1976.
Liitsola died on 18 July 2012, at the age of 79, in Tampere, Finland.

References

External links
 Finnish Hockey Hall of Fame bio

1933 births
2012 deaths
Finnish ice hockey forwards
Tappara players
Finland men's national ice hockey team coaches
Ice hockey people from Tampere